Deerfoot was a long distance runner of the Seneca tribe.

Deerfoot can also refer to:

 Deerfoot-Bad Meat, a famous runner from the Blackfoot tribe
 Deerfoot Trail, a freeway in Calgary, Alberta, Canada named for Deerfoot-Bad Meat
 Deerfoot Mall, an enclosed shopping centre located in northeast Calgary named for Deerfoot-Bad Meat
 The Deerfoot series of novels by Edward S. Ellis
 The foot of a deer, or the dried meat produced from it

See also
Deerhoof, American rock band